Priceite is a white borate mineral. The mineral has been found in places such as Chetco, Oregon, Death Valley, and northwestern Turkey. In 1862 small amounts of this mineral were mined from Chetco, Oregon.

Priceite is rare and has only been found in a few ores. It is related colemanite.

Name and etymology 
The mineral is named after Thomas Price who is the first to study the mineral. The mineral's former name was Pandermite after the Panderma area in Turkey.

References 

Borate minerals